Evercore Inc., formerly known as Evercore Partners, is a global independent investment banking advisory firm founded in 1995 by Roger Altman, David Offensend, and Austin Beutner. The firm has advised on over $4.7 trillion of merger, acquisition, and restructuring transactions since its founding. 

Evercore's Investment Banking business advises its clients on mergers and acquisitions, divestitures, restructurings, financings, public offerings, private placements and other strategic transactions and also provides institutional investors with macro and fundamental equity research, sales and trading execution through Evercore ISI. Evercore's Investment Management business comprises wealth management, institutional asset management and private equity investing. Evercore is widely considered one of the most prestigious and elite investment banking advisory firms.   

Evercore is headquartered in New York City and serves clients from 28 offices in 11 countries across North America, Europe, South America and Asia, with approximately 1,950 employees globally.

History

Founding and establishment 
Evercore Partners was founded by Roger C. Altman in 1995, on the basis that clients would be best served by an investment banking firm free of the conflicts of interest of large financial institutions like Goldman Sachs and Merrill Lynch. 

Roger Altman began his career in investment banking at Lehman Brothers, serving as general partner until 1977. After a role as assistant secretary of the U.S. Treasury until 1981, Altman returned to Lehman as co-head of global investment banking.  

In 1987, Altman joined The Blackstone Group as its head of advisory business before returning to the U.S. Treasury to serve as deputy secretary in 1993. 

In 1995, Altman founded Evercore Partners.

Today, Evercore operates as the world's leading independent investment bank, where Altman continues to serve as Senior Chairman in the business.

Business

Investment banking

Evercore's Investment Banking segment includes the global advisory business through which Evercore delivers strategic corporate advisory, capital markets advisory and institutional equities services.

Mergers and acquisitions
Evercore evaluates potential targets, provides valuation analyses, and evaluates and proposes financial and strategic alternatives. The company provides boards and management teams with independent judgment and expertise as they navigate transactions. Evercore also advises on the timing, structure, financing and pricing of proposed transactions and assists in negotiating and closing these deals. Transaction types include corporate mergers, tender offers, asset purchases, and LBOs.

Restructuring 
Evercore offers strategic and financial restructuring advisory to corporations, creditors, shareholders, and investors facing financial distress, like bankruptcy.

Equity capital markets 
Evercore's equity capital markets business helps companies raise capital as an underwriter primarily through initial public offerings (IPOs), convertible bond issuance, and other equity capital raising functions.

Strategic shareholder advisory 
Evercore's Strategic Shareholder Advisory team provides advisory services on activist issues related to corporate governance, board advisory, activist and raid defense, and hostile takeover situations.

Private capital advisory 
Evercore advises private asset managers (including private equity, debt, or real estate, etc.) on recapitalization, liquidation, or refinancing transactions through its Private Capital Advisory group. This group provides advice on pricing analyses, process recommendations, structuring alternatives, and contract negotiation through the transfer of assets to the closing.

Private funds group 
Evercore's Private Funds Group delivers advisory services on capital raising for sponsors, including general partners raising capital for investments in private equity, debt, and other real assets.

Evercore ISI (Equities) 
Evercore acquired ISI International Strategy & Investment to form Evercore ISI in October 2014. The group engages in independent research, analysis, and sales and trading for equities securities.

Investment management 
Evercore's Investment Management segment includes wealth management and trust services through Evercore Wealth Management L.L.C. ("EWM") and investment management services in Mexico through Evercore Casa de Bolsa, S.A. de C.V. ("ECB"), as well as private equity through investments in entities that manage private equity funds.

Evercore wealth management 
Evercore's U.S.–based Evercore Wealth Management serves high-net-worth individuals, foundations and endowments.

Recent activities 

 In 2009 Evercore advised Wyeth in the largest deal of the year. In 2010 the firm advised Genzyme in the largest healthcare deal of the year.
 In August 2011, the firm completed its acquisition of Lexicon Partners, an independent UK-based investment banking advisory firm.
 In October 2011, Evercore and Kotak Mahindra Capital Company Limited ("Kotak Investment Banking") (a subsidiary of Kotak Mahindra Bank Limited), announced that the two firms had entered into an exclusive strategic alliance for cross-border M&A advisory services between India and the United States, the United Kingdom, and Mexico.
 In November 2011, the firm announced that it had agreed to purchase a 45% non-controlling interest in ABS Investment Management, an institutionally focused equity long/short hedge fund of funds manager.
 In 2012 Evercore advised Kraft in the largest Consumer/Retail deal of the year, as well as TNK-BP in the largest Energy deal of the year.
 In 2013 Evercore advised Dell in the largest technology deal of the year.
 In April 2014, former Evercore banker Perkins Hixon pleaded guilty to insider trading in the securities of Evercore, Westway Group Inc. and Titanium Metals Corporation from 2010 to 2013. He resigned from the company earlier in 2014.
 In August 2014, Evercore announced the acquisition of International Strategy & Investment ("ISI") Group for $440 million. The deal was closed the following October to create Evercore ISI Institutional Equities, offering Macro and Fundamental Research, Sales, and Trading execution. In 2014, the firm secured the second highest number of Institutional Investor #1 positions, after J.P. Morgan, and also ranked No. 5 in total II positions. The same year, Evercore advised AstraZeneca in its defense against Pfizer's hostile takeover.
 Other M&A assignments include advising DuPont on its $68 billion merger of equals with The Dow Chemical Company to create DowDuPont; Medivation on its sale to Pfizer Inc., and Abbott Laboratories on its $31 billion acquisition of St. Jude Medical in the two largest Healthcare transactions of 2016. In addition, the company advised Qualcomm on its pending acquisition of NXP Semiconductors NV in the largest Technology transaction of that year. Evercore also advised Centurylink on its pending acquisition of Level 3 Communications Inc. in the largest Telecom transaction of 2016, and Tesla, Inc. on its $2 billion acquisition of SolarCity.
 Also in 2016, John S. Weinberg joined Evercore from Goldman Sachs as Chairman of the Board and Executive Chairman.
 In 2017, Evercore advised Coach, Inc. on its $2 billion acquisition of Kate Spade New York; Whole Foods Market on its $14 billion sale to Amazon; CVS on its acquisition of Aetna in the largest Healthcare deal of the year; and Qualcomm on its successful defense against Broadcom in the largest contested Technology deal ever.
 In 2018 Evercore has advised the Independent Committee of the Board of Directors of T-Mobile U.S. on its $25.6 billion acquisition of Sprint Corporation, Takeda Pharmaceutical Company Limited on its $62.2 billion acquisition of Shire plc, and Comcast Corporation on its $39 billion acquisition of Sky plc.
 In 2019 Evercore advised National Amusements, Inc. on its $12 billion combination of CBS Corp. and Viacom Inc., Anadarko Petroleum on its $55 billion sale to Occidental Petroleum, and Bristol-Myers Squibb on its $74 billion acquisition of Celgene Corporation in the largest M&A deal of the year.
 In 2020 Evercore advised AstraZeneca on its $39 billion acquisition of Alexion Pharmaceuticals in the largest healthcare M&A deal of the year.
In 2023 Manfred Affenzeller invested a majority stake in Evercore ISI worth $348 million.

See also
 Investment banking
 List of investment banks
 Boutique investment bank

References

External links 

Companies listed on the New York Stock Exchange
Financial services companies established in 1995
Investment banks in the United States
Investment banking private equity groups